Massabrac is a commune in the Haute-Garonne department in southwestern France.

Geography
The Lèze forms part of the commune's northeastern border.

The commune is bordered by four communes, two of them is in Haute-Garonne, and two in Ariège: Castagnac to the northwest, Canens to the east, and finally by the department of Ariège to the northeast and southeast by the communes of Saint-Ybars and Sainte-Suzanne.

Population

See also
Communes of the Haute-Garonne department

References

Communes of Haute-Garonne